In gridiron football, the quarterback position is often defined by a player passing the football within the pocket. However, over the sport's history the position has evolved to feature quarterbacks with elite running ability. These quarterbacks are dubbed "dual-threat" or "running" quarterbacks for their potential to attack opposing defenses through the air or on the ground.

Dual-threat quarterbacks have historically been more prolific at the college level. In the NFL, Cam Newton is the all-time leader in rushing attempts (1,118) and rushing touchdowns (75) for a quarterback, while Michael Vick holds the record for most rushing yards (6,109). In the Canadian Football League (CFL), Damon Allen holds the rushing yards (11,920) and rushing touchdowns (93) record among quarterbacks.

NFL statistical leaders

Career records
Note: stats are accurate as of 2022 NFL season.

Rushing attempts

Rushing yards

Rushing touchdowns

Single-season leaders

Rushing attempts

Rushing yards

Rushing yards per game

Rushing touchdowns

In the Canadian Football League
The width of the CFL's field at 65 yards and the length at 110 yards has allowed quarterbacks to find openings to run the ball, implementing improvisation by a quarterback as a beneficial trait in Canadian football. Quarterback sneaks or other runs in short yardage situations tend to be successful as a result of the distance between the offensive and defensive lines being one yard. Drew Tate, a quarterback for the Calgary Stampeders', led the CFL in rushing touchdowns during the 2014 season with ten scores as the backup to Bo Levi Mitchell. He was primarily used in short yardage situations due to his speed and running ability. Tate scored two one-yard rushing touchdowns in the Stampeders' 20–16 victory over the Hamilton Tiger-Cats in the 102nd Grey Cup.

Statistical CFL leaders

Career rushing yards

Career rushing touchdowns

Single-season rushing yards

Single-game rushing yards

Notes

References

Canadian Football League lists
Dual-threat quarterback records leaders
National Football League records and achievements
National Football League lists